Dunsandle Castle is a 15th-century castle near Athenry, County Galway, in Ireland.

History 
Dunsandle Castle is referenced by Nolan, J.P. Galway Castles and Owners in 1574  (Barons of Kingestowne Athenry) the owner being Villig Osebeg of Dunsandle.

The castle was first held by the De Burgo (Burke) family, acceded to the Dalys and has recently been restored under the guidance of the architect David Newman Johnson.

Dunsandle Castle is replete with unique architectural features including a great hall with tie beams unusual in Irish architecture of this period.

Also unique to Dunsandle is its Groin Vault construction. This was first exploited by the Romans, but then fell into relative obscurity in Europe until the resurgence of quality stone building brought about by Carolingian and Romanesque architecture. Difficult to construct neatly because of the geometry of the cross groins (usually elliptical in cross section), the groin vault required great skill in cutting stone to form a neat arris. This difficulty, in addition to the formwork required to create such constructions, led to the rib vault superseding the groin vault as the preferred solution for enclosing space in Gothic architecture.

Dunsandle also has an 18th-century ice house, remains of a later extension and Bawn with defence tower complete with gunloops. The castle is surrounded by native Irish woodland.

References

Sources 
 Nolan, J.P. Galway Castles and Owners in 1574 (Barons of Kingestowne Athenry)

External links 
Official Web site

Castles in County Galway
Historic house museums in the Republic of Ireland
Museums in County Galway